The School of Dance was founded by Merrilee Hodgins and Joyce Shietze. The School of Dance opened its doors on Wellington Street, in the west of Ottawa, in 1978, as a nationally registered, educational, charitable, non-profit organization designed to provide professional training for dance. The budget was $11,000, with three staff, and the studios were rented.

History 
In 1979, Celia Franca, a longtime friend and artistic colleague of both Hodgins and Shietze, joined, as co-artistic directors. With the addition of the legendary Franca, founder of the National Ballet of Canada and co-founder of the National Ballet School, Its unwavering standards of excellence became crystallized, and the stage was set for it to grow into the world class arts education institution it is today.

Students come from across Canada, many other countries, and every ward in Ottawa; graduates can be found worldwide, as dancers, choreographers, teachers, arts administrators and directors.

The School of Dance has grown in virtually every aspect of its operations from its professional programming and its accessibility projects and outreach activities to its arts education classes for the community, reaching more than 70,000 people each year. The School of Dance is recognized in Ontario as a private career college and a seminary of learning. The Contemporary Dance Programme is approved as a vocational program under the Private Career Colleges Act, 2005.

Hodgins directs The School of Dance with an operating budget of over $1 million and a growing staff of 3 full-time and 87 contract teachers, musicians, choreographers and artists.

From the mid-1980s to 1999, The School of Dance rented a three-studio facility on Catherine Street.

In 1996, The School of Dance added professional modern dance training and teacher training.

In 1998, The School of Dance began its co-operative relationship with the National Arts Centre, producing choreography in orchestral settings to introduce dance to children.

In 2000, The School of Dance purchased 200 Crichton Street, the former Crichton Street Public School.

In 2001, The School of Dance launched DanceONTour® as its outreach vehicle of arts education for academic schools in Ottawa and surrounding areas.

In 2002, The School of Dance doubled the number of its outreach programmes to the over 300 projects it now delivers per year. In the same year, The School of Dance launched DanceAbility, a specially designed dance programme for individuals with disabilities.

In 2003, The School of Dance launched the Inside Out Series of creative process lectures and performances, now named ISO 200, and hired a co-ordinator to manage the outreach and arts education projects.

In 2004, The School of Dance expanded its bilingual programming, with the recognition that its enrollment included an increasing number of francophone students. It also launched its Artists in Residence Programme, with five visual artists and a poet.

In 2005, The School of Dancel more than doubled the DanceONTour projects to 59 and included tours to Montreal, Quebec City, Cornwall, Hamilton, and the Upper Ottawa Valley.

In June 2006, The School of Dance produced a theatrical celebration for Franca's 85th birthday. In 2006, Collected New Works on Film, a 30-year archival collection of choreographic materials, was launched, as a national project with the support of the resident Stuart Conger Learning Centre.

In 2007, The School of Dance began expanding its guest choreographers to include some of Canada's finest im contemporary dance: Emmanuel Jouthe, Heidi Strauss, Marc Boivin, Serge Bennathan, Sarah Williams, Dana Gingras, Louise Bedard, Tedd Robinson, Peggy Baker, Sasha Ivanochko, Chick Snipper, Ginelle Chagnon and many others. Its guest teachers eventually included Andrew Harwood, Peter Ryan, Annemarie Cabri, Shaun Amyot, Jane Wooding, Eliot Rudolph, Massimo Agostinelli and many others.

In 2008, The School of Dance completed 107 DanceONTour projects, produced over 20 theatrical performances, and launched Dancing in the Street, a series of urban events in the City of Ottawa. Shall We Dance? was a specialized movement programme that began in Ottawa hospitals.

In 2009, The School of Dance celebrated its 30th anniversary, with a gala performance at the National Arts Centre with national stars and current students, creating an additional 30 events for the community.

In 2010, The School of Dances Extension Services expanded to include workshops, short courses, guest lectures, a book and video library and mentorship for Ottawa's new and emerging choreographers, dancers and musicians. It provides more than 4,600 h of studio space to Ottawa's arts community, either free or with a substantial discount, and it welcomes more than 40 organizations and artists to use space. The School of Dance launched DragonFly® for Learners with Down Syndrome.

In 2011, The School of Dance launched SODA, its alumni organization.

In 2012, The School of Dance was recognized as a private career college, and the Contemporary Dance Programme became a diploma-granting program. The School of Dance launched Gallery 200 and its new community spaces on the second floor of its building, including two new dance studios.

In 2013, Senator Jim Munson presented Artistic Director Hodgins with the Queen Elizabeth II Diamond Jubilee Medal in recognition of her contributions to arts education. Also, the Ontario Trillium Foundation committed three years' funding to DragonFly®, The School of Dance programme for Learners with Down Syndrome.

In 2014,The School of Dance employed 70 of Ottawa's artists and created NEW employment opportunities and mentorships for 6 young artists in the Dances by Youth for Youth mentorship project, 11 young artists for the Dancing in the Street and JUMP! animation projects, and 12 artists in the health-oriented Dance of Life programme.

In 2015, The School of Dance launched Dance is BEST, with new funding from the Ontario government for 40 dance workshops and arts activities designed to encourage physical activity, provide challenges for the brain, expand enjoyment of the arts and build new connections, both literally and figuratively, by connecting seniors and youth. The Dance is BEST projects will be presented in collaboration with Bruyère Continuing Care of Ottawa at four centres: Élisabeth Bruyère Residence, Saint-Louis Residence in connection with the Bruyère Village senior apartments, Saint Vincent Hospital, and Élisabeth Bruyère Hospital.

In September 2015, The School of Dance began a year-long celebration of 37 years in Ontario, with a performance collaboration with the National Arts Centre Orchestra and the launch of Connecting With Dance for patients with Parkinson's disease.

In 2016, Canada’s 150th birthday year saw TSOD celebrating with the Water Project in 11 fountains around Ottawa, Dancing in the Street in the Byward Market as guest artists of the City of Ottawa, 55 performances in 5 theatres and students from every province in Canada. In May 2016, the baby’s and toddlers program in the dragonfly division was created.

In 2017, DanceONTour completed 264 projects in 91 sites around Ottawa.

In 2018, The School launched Season 40, with the number 40 nestled into its original word-mark, vertical logo. The year-log celebrations include special programmes with the National Arts Centre and the National Gallery of Canada, plus more that 40 outreach projects all over Ottawa.

In 2019, The School expanded all of its Senior’s programmes to include health and wellness activities.

In 2020, The School began a busy season of 37 performances, 105 outreach workshops, hosting multiple guest choreographers.  When COVD-19 struck the world, the Province of Ontario mandated the closing of the building.  All classes, workshops, and performances moved online.

In 2021, The School continued offering online classes in addition to in-person activities when possible.  Performances moved online.

External links 
 The School of Dance
 The School of Dance Artist-In-Residence
 The Celia Franca Foundation
 DragonFly®, The School of Dance Programme for Learners with Down Syndrome
 Gallery 200, a curated public gallery

Dance schools in Canada
Ballet schools in Canada
Educational institutions established in 1978
Schools in Ottawa